Alex Sorgente is an American park skateboarder. He participated at the 2016 World Skateboarding Championship, being awarded the gold medal in the park event. Sorgente was set to participate at the 2020 Summer Olympics in the skateboarding competition, but had a sprained ankle. Sorgente also participated at the X Games.

References

External links 

Living people
Year of birth missing (living people)
Sportspeople from Boynton Beach, Florida
American skateboarders
X Games athletes
World Skateboarding Championship medalists